Devils Back in Massachusetts, USA, is a very small and barren rock in the Atlantic Ocean located within the city limits of Boston. The rock is northeast of Aldridge Ledge, southwest of Commissioners Ledge, northwest of Half Tide Rocks, west of Green Island, and just east of the South Channel.

Islands of Massachusetts
Landforms of Boston
Islands of Suffolk County, Massachusetts
Coastal islands of Massachusetts